Supandi (born May 24, 1989) is an Indonesian footballer who currently plays for Deltras FC in the Indonesia Super League.

References

External links

1989 births
Association football defenders
Living people
Indonesian footballers
Liga 1 (Indonesia) players
Deltras F.C. players